Bazuk-e Arbab (also Romanized as Bāzūk-e Ārbāb; also known as Bāzok) is a village in Sakhvid Rural District, Nir District, Taft County, Yazd Province, Iran. At the 2006 census, its population was 50, in 11 families.

References 

Populated places in Taft County